Mostafa Monwar (born Mostafa Monwar Al-Azim) is a Bangladeshi actor, writer, and screenwriter known for starring as the protagonist in Live from Dhaka, for which he received 2016 Singapore International Film Festival awards for Best Performance.

Early life
Monwar grew up in Indira Road, Dhaka. In 1998, he joined Prachyanat and acted several street dramas with them. He completed his graduation from North South University. He was also a member of NSU Cine & Drama Club.

Career

Acting
In 2011, Mostofa Monwar made his film debut in Guerrilla. In 2016, he starred as Sazzad in Live from Dhaka. In 2017, he acted in the TV series Chabial Reunion. In 2018, his third film Sincerely Yours, Dhaka released. In 2019, he starred in Hoichoi series Dhaka Metro. In 2019, he also acted as Sohel in the film Made in Bangladesh. In 2020, Monwar starred as Selim in another Hoichoi series Ekattor. In July 2021, he acted as Sabila's husband Arif in ZEE5 series Ladies & Gentleman. In the same month, he appeared as Kabir in Chorki anthology series Unoloukik. In October 2021, he was cast as the ambulance driver in No Ground Beneath the Feet. In December 2021, he portrayed Zahir Raihan in another Chorki series Jaago Bahey, for which he got Channel I Digital Media Award 2021 as the Best Emerging Actor of the year. In March 2022, he starred in the film Gunin.

Writing
In 2011, Monwar wrote the script of television drama Holud. In 2014, his book Melodrama got published.

Personal life
Monwar married Subrina Erine in 2018.

Acting credits

Film

Television

Awards

References

External links

Living people
Bangladeshi actors
North South University alumni
Bangladeshi writers
Bangladeshi male film actors
Year of birth missing (living people)